Annisul Huq (27 September 1952 – 30 November 2017) was a Bangladeshi Entrepreneur, television show host and the mayor of Dhaka North City Corporation.

Early life and education
He was born on 27 September 1952, Sonapur at Sonagazi in Noakhali to Shariful Huq and Rowshan Ara Huq. He passed SSC from Dinajpur Zilla School  in 1970 and intermediate from Govt Science College. He completed his bachelor's degree from the University of Rajshahi and had a master's in economics from the University of Chittagong. His father was an official of the Bangladesh Ansar.

Career

Television
Huq was a regular host on Bangladesh Television in the early 1980s. He had hosted interviews with politically significant personalities.

Business
Huq established his own business, Mohammadi Group in 1986 and had been the chairperson of the company before his death. As of 2007, the group had 7,000 employees in the textile and garments sector. The conglomerate is also involved in real estate, IT, a power generation company that directly contributes to the national grid and a distribution company that represents multiple foreign television channels. The group has an independent TV channel named Nagorik.

Huq served as the president of several apex bodies including the South Asian Association for Regional Cooperation (SAARC) Chamber of Commerce and Industry, Garment Manufacturers and Exporters Association (BGMEA), Federation of the Bangladesh Chamber of Commerce and Industry (FBCCI) and Independent Power Producers Association.

Politics
Huq was elected the mayor of Dhaka North City Corporation on ticket of Bangladesh Awami League in the City Corporation election of 2015. He was a surprise pick by the Awami League as no other leaders of the party stood for the position. According to the affidavits submitted to the Election Commission in March 2015, he had amassed a net worth of US$3.25 million.

As mayor, Huq promised to build Dhaka into a clean, green and safe city, although he received some flak for his involvement of foreigners. 20,000 illegal billboards were removed as part of the clean-up project. Mayor Huq made it clear that he will not put up with resistance from vested interests in his clean-up efforts.

Huq also promised to reduce corruption among governmental employees.

Awards
 National ICT Award, (2017)

Personal life
Huq's younger brother General Abu Belal Mohammad Shafiul Huq was the 15th chief of Bangladesh Army. Huq was married to Rubana Huq. Together they have three children – Navidul Huq, Wamiq Umaira and Tanisha Fariamaan Huq.

Death
In July 2017, Huq was admitted to a hospital in London. He was diagnosed with cerebral vasculitis. He died on 30 November 2017, after being in a sedative condition for more than three months.

References

1952 births
2017 deaths
People from Noakhali District
Mayors of Dhaka
Bangladeshi businesspeople
University of Chittagong alumni
Bangladeshi television personalities
Burials at Banani Graveyard